Samjhota is a Pakistani drama series that premiered on ARY Digital on January 16 in 2023. Directed by Asad Jabal and written by Rukhsana Nigar, it is a production of iDream Entertainment. It has Adeel Chaudhary, Momina Iqbal, Shazeal Shoukat, Sidra Niazi, Ali Ansar, Shaista Lodhi, Jawed Sheikh, Mirza Zain Baig and Saba Faisal in lead roles.

Synopsis 
Samjhota is a story of a businessman trying to gather himself and his family after his wife's passing. Later Waqar marries Nargis and she faces difficulties with his children.

Cast 
 Jawed Sheikh as Waqar (Munzzah's husband)
 Saba Faisal as Munazzah (Waqar's wife)
 Adeel Chaudhary as Asad (Munzzah and Waqar's son)
 Shaista Lodhi as Nargis (Waqar's second wife)
 Mirza Zain Baig as Sarmad (Kubra's sister)
 Shazeal Shoukat as Shanzay (Waqar and Munzzah's daughter)
 Sidra Niazi as Alizeh (Asad's wife)
 Sajida Syed as Husna (Rohail's mother and Waqar's sister)
 Ali Ansari as Zohiab (Munzzah and Waqar's son)
 Momina Iqbal as Mehreen (Zohiab's wife)
 Huma Nawab as Azra (Sarmad and Kubra's step-mother)
 Sadaf Aashan as Sobia (Ejaz's wife and Nargis's sister-in-law)
 Noor ul Hassan as Ahmad (Kubra and Sarmad's father)
 Izzah Malik as Warda (Shanzay's friend)
 Aliha Chaudry as Kubra (Sarmad's sister)
 Faraz Farooqui as Rohail (Husna's son and Waqar's nephew)
 Amber Khan as Fouzia (Alizeh's mother and Asad's mother-in-law)
 Sajid Shah as Ejaz (Sobia's husband and Mehreen's uncle)
 Shamoon Abbasi as Nargis's ex-husband
 Hina Sheikh
 Anees Alam as Imtiaz (Waqar's servant)
 Shazia Qaiser
 Urooj Abbas as Javed (Sharjeel's father)
 Salma Qadir as Rubina (Azra's friend)

References

External links 
 Official Website

Pakistani drama television series
2023 Pakistani television series debuts
Pakistani television series
Urdu-language television shows